The 2019 season was FC Honka's 11th season in the Veikkausliiga. On 3 November 2019, Honka secured a spot in the Europa League 2020–21  first round of  qualification by winning IFK Mariehamn 3 - 1 on aggregate in the European competition play-off finals.

Squad

On loan

Transfers

Winter

In

Out

Summer

In

Out

Competitions

Veikkausliiga

The 2019 Veikkausliiga season begins on 3 April 2019 and ends on 3 November 2019.

League table

Results summary

Results by matchday

Regular season

Championship series

European play-off final

Finnish Cup

Sixth Round

Knockout stages

Squad statistics

Appearances and goals

 
 

|-
|colspan="14"|Players who left Honka during the season:

|}

Goal scorers

Disciplinary record

Notes

References

2019
Honka